Annamanada is a village in a southern corner of Thrissur district in the Indian state of Kerala. It is situated 8 km from Mala and 10 km south of Chalakudy.The locals call Annamanada as "Annanta" and"Annamanta"

Transportation

Buses avail from Chalakudy, Angamaly, Kodungalloor, Irinjalakuda, Alwaye, Trichur bus stations to Annamanada Bus Station. Nearest Railway station Chalakudi – 12 km and Koratty 5 km. Nearest Airport- Nedumbassery (Kochi)-16 km, Total Area -2.5 km. Major Town Area Includes Annamanada Central, South Annamanada(Palissery), Ambalanada, Kallur.2 (Approx)

History
Originally this village was  part of Adoor gramam in Cochin kingdom neighbouring to Travancore kingdom. (Some of the neighbouring villages still known as Mel-Adoor, Keez-Adoor etc.). During the nineteenth century there was a dispute between these kingdoms regarding the ownership of this gramam and the temple. The case gone to East India Company and their arbitrator made their judgement in favour of Cochin kingdom. Some meetings also conducted between Travancore and Cochin kings in this village. There was a court and police station located in this village during the kingdom region. At period of Cochin kingdom region  in that court two judges from Muslim Community. One senior judge Kandarumadathil Mr. Ahammedhunni Mather and other Mr. Bava Kutty Mather.

Administration
Annamanada is the headquarters of Annamanada Grama Panchayat, which includes 10-15 villages. Chalakudi River passing east side of this village. There is a bus station, Govt treasury, Govt Sub Registrar Office, Post office, Electricity office, Banks, Schools, Govt. ayurvedic hospital, Telephone Exchange, Medical clinics etc. located in this village. In addition to this, there are some cultural institutions like Achutha marar memorial vadiakalakendram also located in Annamanada.

Neighbouring villages of annamanada are as under  
North -  Kallur & Vennur
South – Kumbidy & Palissery (South Annamanada)
West – Edayattoor
East – Chalakudi River –Villages located other Side of Chalakudi River is Valoor and Mambra

There is a bridge connecting  Annamanada to Koratty (NH 47) via Valoor - Pulikkakadavu palam. Now buses connecting Annamanada to Chalakudi, Angamaly passing through this bridge.

Annamanada Mahadeva Temple
The name "Annamanada" came from some Brahmin families (Manas) where Brahmins used to get free food (Annam) in older days.  The village where Food (Annam) serving Brahmin families (manas) situated, later known as Annamanada.

Annamanada is famous for old (more than 1000 years) Mahadeva temple, which is located near the bank of Chalakudi River.
10 km south of Chalakudi on the Mala route and is about 5 km from Mala in Thrissur District. The presiding deity of the temple is Lord Shiva. The shivling is almost four feet tall and is considered as the Kiratamoorthy in a pleasing mood while giving Pashupatastra to Arjuna.
The temple faces to the east and the sanctum is square shaped. There is a low Valiabalikkal in front of the Agramandapam on the eastern side and a bali peetha equal in height of the basement of the shrikovil. The sopana with carved hasti-hasta railings on either side provides access to the square Mukha Mandapam. The doors on the south and the west lead to the shrines of Lord Ganesh and Goddess Parvati respectively. The Mukha mandapam and the shrikovil have dvi-tala structure, which is covered with copper sheet. The nalam balam of the temple has two thidappallies. On the northern side of the nalambalam lies the shrine of Lord Vishnu. In the outer prakaram (outer courtyard) there is a tank and the oottupura in the north-east corner. The other deities of the temple are Shasta, Goshala Krishnan, Mahakali, Nagaraja, Durga mounted on lion and Narasimha.
The annual festival is celebrated during February or March. The festival lasts for ten days and is observed with pomp and pageantry. Peoples from surrounding villages gather here for worshipping lord Shiva in this temple, mainly in this festival time. Aarattu, Laksha deepam (one lack chirags) on eighth day etc. are very famous. Shivarathri ustav also celebrating in this temple. The arattu on the concluding day of the annual festival is done in the Annamanada River. Mahadeva Temple controlled by Cochin Devaswom board.

Christ King Church
About 50 years back very few Christian families only were in Annamanada compared to neighbor villages. During last fifty years so many families migrated to Annamanada and a church (Christ king church) constructed and blessed the same during 1984. Before constructing this church Christians from Annamanada village used to go churches in the surrounding villages mainly Meladoor church, which is located almost center of Annamanada panchayat. Feast of Annamanada church celebrating forth Sunday of November. Generally the celebration lasting one week and the main celebrations are last three days i.e. Saturday (Ambu thirunal), Sunday and Monday (Angadi Ambu). This church coming under Irinjalakuda Diocese. Two Christian convents also operating under this church.

Siddique Juma Masjidh 
The History of Muslim community in Annamanada village is also very old. Hundreds of years back presence of Muslim community was there and there was a Muslim Mosque in Kallur, name Adoor Sidhique Jumaa Masjid wakfy Kandarumadathil Janab Ahammedunni Mather. This is the  first mosque  in Annamanada . Now there is a new mosque also in Annamanada junction constructed few years back. Majority of population in of surrounding villages like Mambra, Valoor and Kallur are Muslims. Muslims was the major business peoples in this village.

Laughter Club
Annamanada is also famous for the first Laughter club in Kerala state established in sept 2001 under the guidance of Dr. Shibu Pandalai. 
There are two junctions in this village – North Junction where school, Bus station, Banks, Mosque etc. located and in the south Junction. Temple & Church located. Roads connected to Mala and Alwaye from south Junction and Chalakudi. Angamaly, and Ashtamichira from North Junction.

The place is famous for Mahadeva temple, where the presiding deity is Lord Shiva. Annamanada is a place of historical importance and was the venue of two historic interviews between the rulers of Travancore and Cochin in the later part of the eighteenth century.

References

External links 

 Annamanada Mahadeva Temple
 Annamanada Mahadevar Temple Facebook Page
 Annamanada Town Facebook Page

Cities and towns in Thrissur district